Pseudofulvibacter gastropodicola is a Gram-negative, aerobic, rod-shaped and non-motile bacterium from the genus of Pseudofulvibacter.

References

Flavobacteria
Bacteria described in 2016